Patrik Camilo Cornélio da Silva, sometimes known as just Patrik (born 19 July 1990), is a Brazilian football player who plays for Rio Claro as an attacking midfielder.

Career
The youngster Patrik Silva, began his career play for Palmeiras B, and was loaned to São Caetano between 2007 and 2009. In 2010, he returned to Palmeiras, this time playing for the main squad and made his debut. He has scored 1 goal for Palmeiras in a friendly match against XV de Piracicaba.

In the 2011 Paulista Champíonship, Patrik Silva gained a starting-role in Palmeiras first-team and scored important goals to help his club throughout the competition.

On 11 March 2013, Patrick joined South Korean outfit Gangwon FC on a season-long loan deal.

References

External links
Profile at Palmeiras website

1990 births
Living people
Brazilian footballers
Brazilian expatriate footballers
Sociedade Esportiva Palmeiras players
Associação Desportiva São Caetano players
Gangwon FC players
Sport Club do Recife players
Rio Claro Futebol Clube players
Campeonato Brasileiro Série A players
Campeonato Brasileiro Série B players
K League 1 players
Expatriate footballers in South Korea
Brazilian expatriate sportspeople in South Korea
Association football forwards
Footballers from São Paulo